Benedictus Canonicus Sancti Petri ("Benedict, canon of St. Peter's") was a religious and liturgical writer from Rome active in the first half of the 12th century. Benedict was one of the four canons of the old Basilica of St. Peter, who celebrated mass in the church; almost nothing is known about his life. He is author of the Liber polypticus (or Liber Politicus), in which, among others, is contained the Ordo Romanus; this book was written between 1140 and 1143, when he was already advanced in years. His work is important because of the contained information about institutions and religious celebrations and feasts of 12th century Rome.

Notes

Sources

Writers from Rome
Clergy from Rome
12th-century Latin writers
People of medieval Rome
12th-century Italian Roman Catholic priests
12th-century deaths